Choi Sung-min may refer to:

, South Korean actor
Choi Sung-min (actor) (born 1995), South Korean singer